Heterostemon is a genus of flowering plants in the family Fabaceae. It belongs to the subfamily Detarioideae. It is usually green and often has white dots along its leaves.

Species accepted by the Plants of the World Online as of February 2021:

Heterostemon conjugatus 
Heterostemon ellipticus 
Heterostemon impar 
Heterostemon ingifolius 
Heterostemon mazarunensis 
Heterostemon mimosoides 
Heterostemon otophorus

References

Detarioideae
Fabaceae genera